Octane is a hydrocarbon and an alkane with the chemical formula , and the condensed structural formula . Octane has many structural isomers that differ by the amount and location of branching in the carbon chain. One of these isomers, 2,2,4-trimethylpentane (commonly called iso-octane) is used as one of the standard values in the octane rating scale.

Octane is a component of gasoline (petrol). As with all low-molecular-weight hydrocarbons, octane is volatile and very flammable.

Use of the term in gasoline
"Octane" is colloquially used as a short form of "octane rating", particularly in the expression "high octane". "Octane rating" is an index of a fuel's ability to resist engine knock in engines having different compression ratios, which is a characteristic of octane's branched-chain isomers, especially iso-octane. 
The octane rating of gasoline is not directly related to the power output of an engine. Using gasoline of a higher octane than an engine is designed for cannot increase power output.

The octane rating was originally determined by mixing fuels from only normal heptane and iso-octane (2,2,4-trimethylpentane, a highly branched octane), and assigning anti-knock ratings of zero for normal heptane and 100 for pure iso-octane. The anti-knock rating of this mixture would be the same as the percentage of iso-octane in the mix. Different isomers of octane can contribute to a lower or higher octane rating. For example, n-octane (the straight chain of 8 carbon atoms with no branching) has a -20 (negative) Research Octane Rating, whereas pure iso-octane has an RON rating of 100. Some fuels have an octane rating higher than 100, notably those containing methanol or ethanol.

Metaphorical use
Octane became well known in American popular culture in the mid- and late 1960s, when gasoline companies boasted of "high octane" levels in their gasoline advertisements.

The compound adjective "high-octane", meaning powerful or dynamic, is recorded in a figurative sense from 1944. By the mid-1990s, the phrase was commonly being used as an intensifier and it has found a place in modern English vernacular.

Isomers
Octane has 18 structural isomers (24 including stereoisomers):
Octane (n-octane)
2-Methylheptane
3-Methylheptane (2 enantiomers)
4-Methylheptane
3-Ethylhexane
2,2-Dimethylhexane
2,3-Dimethylhexane (2 enantiomers)
2,4-Dimethylhexane (2 enantiomers)
2,5-Dimethylhexane
3,3-Dimethylhexane
3,4-Dimethylhexane (2 enantiomers + 1 meso compound)
3-Ethyl-2-methylpentane
3-Ethyl-3-methylpentane
2,2,3-Trimethylpentane (2 enantiomers)
2,2,4-Trimethylpentane (isooctane)
2,3,3-Trimethylpentane
2,3,4-Trimethylpentane
2,2,3,3-Tetramethylbutane

References

External links
 
 
 Dr. Duke's Phytochemical and Ethnobotanical Databases, Octane, 

Alkanes
Hydrocarbons